On Being a Christian is a 1974 work of Christian theology by Hans Küng.

Content
The author describes what is common among the various Christian communities and discussed the reasons a person would choose to believe in Christianity. The book focuses on the life and teaching of Jesus Christ and the nature of his divinity.

Reactions
Certain aspects of the book were criticized by the Conference of the German Bishops in 1975 for its apparent lack of doctrinal orthodoxy.

References

1974 non-fiction books
Books about Christianity